Andrew Harriott (born 3 May 1992) is an Australian cricketer who played a single match for the Melbourne Renegades.

References

1992 births
Living people
Australian cricketers
Cricketers from the Australian Capital Territory
ACT Comets cricketers
Sportspeople from Canberra
Melbourne Renegades cricketers
Wicket-keepers